Do I Love You may refer to:

"Do I Love You?", 1939 song by Cole Porter, from the musical Du Barry Was a Lady
"Do I Love You (Yes in Every Way)", by Donna Fargo
"Do I Love You (Indeed I Do)", by Frank Wilson
"Do I Love You?" (The Ronettes song), a 1964 single